The Malta Rugby Union National Championship, better known as the Cisk Lager League for sponsorship reasons, is the highest tier of Rugby Union in Malta. It is sponsored by Cisk Lager and run by the Malta Rugby Football Union. Champions of the previous season play the winner of the Mediterranean Bank Cup, which runs parallel, in the Ray Elliot Cup, which serves a super cup. 

The league is played in the Marsa Sports Complex since the clubs do not own stadiums.

Teams
The league consists of four teams:
 Sliema Stompers RFC
 Ħamrun Kavallieri RFC
 Qrendi Falcons RFC
 Swieqi Overseas RFC

Former teams include Qormi Wasps, Valletta Lions, and Birkirkara Alligators.

References

Rugby union in Malta
Malta
rugby union